This article lists the members of the Indonesian Regional Representative Council from 2004 to 2009. The first Regional Representative Council follows the 2004 Indonesian legislative election held on 5 April 2004. There are 128 elected senators in the Parliament.

Even though the senators were required to be independent, several senators were affiliated to certain political party.

Speaker and deputy speaker

List of members

References 

People's Consultative Assembly
Regional Representative Council